The GEM character set is the character set of Digital Research's graphical user interface GEM on Intel platforms. It is based on code page 437, the original character set of the IBM PC, and like that set includes ASCII codes 32–126, extended codes for accented letters (diacritics), and other symbols. It differs from code page 437 in using other dingbats at code points 0–31, in exchanging the box-drawing characters 176–223 for international characters and other symbols, and exchanging code point 236 with the symbol for line integral. However, GEM is more similar to code page 865 because the codepoints of Ø and ø match the codepoints in that codepage.

The Motorola-based GEM adaptation for the Atari ST family of computers utilized the similar Atari ST character set. It has swapped ¢ and ø and has also swapped ¥ and Ø (to match code page 437 more). Codepoints 12, 13, and 27 are mapped to the C0 controls.

A slight adaptation for Ventura Publisher is the similar Ventura International character set, it has code points 0-31, 127, and 218-255 empty, and has swapped ¢ and ø and has also swapped ¥ and Ø (to match code page 437 more).

In contrast to this, the GEM-derived file manager ViewMAX, which shipped with some versions of DR DOS as a DOSSHELL replacement, does not use the GEM character set, but loads its display fonts from DOS .CPI files depending on the system's current code page.

Character set
The following table shows the GEM character set. Each character is shown with a potential Unicode equivalent, although some codes do not have a unique, single Unicode equivalent; the correct choice may depend upon context. Note that code point 20 (1416) has an unfilled paragraph sign,
and code point 188 (BC16) has a filled paragraph sign.

See also 
 Atari ST character set
 Western Latin character sets (computing)
 Alt codes
 Bitstream International Character Set
 Ventura International Character Set

References 

Character sets
Computer-related introductions in 1985